Quebecius is an extinct genus of porolepiform sarcopterygian fish which lived during the Late Devonian period of Quebec, Canada.

References 

Prehistoric lobe-finned fish genera
Porolepiformes
†
Devonian fish of North America